Cologne Cathedral (officially , English: Cathedral Church of Saint Peter) is a Catholic cathedral in Cologne, North Rhine-Westphalia. It is the seat of the Archbishop of Cologne and of the administration of the Archdiocese of Cologne. It is a renowned monument of German Catholicism and Gothic architecture and was declared a World Heritage Site in 1996. It is Germany's most visited landmark, attracting an average of 20,000 people a day. At , the cathedral is the tallest twin-spired church in the world, the second tallest church in Europe after Ulm Minster, and the third tallest church of any kind in the world.

It is the largest Gothic church in Northern Europe and has the second-tallest spires. The towers for its two huge spires give the cathedral the largest façade of any church in the world. The choir has the largest height-to-width ratio, 3.6:1, of any medieval church.

Construction of Cologne Cathedral began in 1248 but was halted in the years around 1560, unfinished. Attempts to complete the construction began around 1814 but the project was not properly funded until the 1840s. The edifice was completed to its original Medieval plan in 1880.

Cologne's medieval builders had planned a grand structure to house the reliquary of the Three Kings and fit for its role as a place of worship for the Holy Roman Emperor. Despite having been left incomplete during the medieval period, Cologne Cathedral eventually became unified as "a masterpiece of exceptional intrinsic value" and "a powerful testimony to the strength and persistence of Christian belief in medieval and modern Europe". Only the telecommunications tower is higher than the cathedral.

History

Ancient site 
When construction began on the present Cologne Cathedral in 1248 with laying a foundation stone, the site had already been occupied by several previous structures. The earliest may have been for grain storage and possibly was succeeded by a Roman temple built by Mercurius Augustus. From the 4th century on, however, the site was occupied by Christian buildings, including a square edifice known as the "oldest cathedral" that was commissioned by Maternus, the first bishop of Cologne. A free-standing baptistery dating back to the 7th century was located at the east end of the present cathedral but was demolished in the 9th century to build the second cathedral. During excavations of the present cathedral, graves were discovered in the location of the oldest portion of the building; including that of a boy that was richly adorned with grave goods and another of a woman, popularly thought to be Wisigard. Both graves are thought to be from the 6th century. Only ruins of the baptistery and the octagonal baptismal font remain today.

The second church, called the "Old Cathedral", was completed in 818. It was destroyed by fire on 30 April 1248, during demolition work to prepare for a new cathedral.

Medieval beginning 

In 1164, the Archbishop of Cologne, Rainald of Dassel, acquired the relics of the Three Kings which the Holy Roman Emperor, Frederick Barbarossa, had taken from the Basilica of Sant'Eustorgio, Milan, Italy. (Parts of the relics have since been returned to Milan.) The relics have great religious significance and drew pilgrims from all over Christendom. It was important to church officials that they be properly housed, and thus began a building program in the new style of Gothic architecture, based in particular on the French cathedral of Amiens.

The foundation stone was laid on Saturday, 15 August 1248, by Archbishop Konrad von Hochstaden. The eastern arm was completed under the direction of Master Gerhard, was consecrated in 1322 and sealed off by a temporary wall so it could be used as the work continued. Eighty-four misericords in the choir date from this building phase.

In the mid-14th century work on the west front commenced under Master Michael. This work ceased in 1473, leaving the south tower complete to the belfry level and crowned with a huge crane that remained in place as a landmark of the Cologne skyline for 400 years. Some work proceeded intermittently on the structure of the nave between the west front and the eastern arm, but during the 16th century this also stopped.

19th-century completion 
With the 19th-century Romantic enthusiasm for the Middle Ages, and spurred by the discovery of the original plan for the façade, the Protestant Prussian Court working with the church, committed to complete the cathedral. It was achieved by civic effort; the Central-Dombauverein, founded in 1842, raised two-thirds of the enormous costs, while the Prussian state supplied the remaining third. The state saw this as a way to improve its relations with the large number of Catholic subjects it had gained in 1815, but especially after 1871, it was regarded as a project to symbolize German nationhood.

Work resumed in 1842 to the original design of the surviving medieval plans and drawings, but using more modern construction techniques, including iron roof girders. The nave was completed and the towers were added. The bells were installed in the 1870s. The largest bell is St. Petersglocke.

The completion of Germany's largest cathedral was celebrated as a national event on 14 August 1880, 632 years after construction had begun.

World War II and post-war history 

The cathedral suffered fourteen hits by aerial bombs during World War II. Badly damaged, it nevertheless remained standing in an otherwise completely flattened city. The twin spires were an easily recognizable navigational landmark for Allied aircraft bombing.

On 6 March 1945, an area west of the cathedral (Marzellenstrasse/Trankgasse) was the site of intense combat between American tanks of the 3rd Armored Division and a Panther Ausf. A of Panzer brigade 106 Feldherrnhalle. A nearby Panther, a German medium tank, was sitting by a pile of rubble near a train station right by the twin spires of the Cologne Cathedral. The Panther successfully knocked out two Sherman tanks, killing three men, before it was destroyed by a T26E3 Pershing, nicknamed Eagle 7, minutes later. Film footage of that battle survives. The destroyed Panther was later put on display at the base of the cathedral for the remainder of the war in Europe.

Repairs of the war damage were completed in 1956. A repair to part of the northwest tower, carried out in 1944 using poor-quality brick taken from a nearby ruined building, remained visible as a reminder of the war until 2005, when it was restored to its original appearance.

To investigate whether the bombings had damaged the foundations of the Dom, archaeological excavations began in 1946 under the leadership of Otto Doppelfeld and were concluded in 1997. One of the most meaningful excavations of churches, they revealed previously unknown details of earlier buildings on the site.

Repair and maintenance work is constantly being carried out in the building, which is rarely free of scaffolding, as wind, rain, and pollution slowly eat away at the stones. The Dombauhütte, established to build the cathedral and keep it in repair, is said to employ the best stonemasons in the Rhineland. Half the costs of repair and maintenance are still borne by the Dombauverein.

21st century 
On 18 August 2005, Pope Benedict XVI visited the cathedral during his apostolic visit to Germany, as part of World Youth Day 2005 festivities. An estimated one million pilgrims visited the cathedral during this time. Also as part of the events of World Youth Day, Cologne Cathedral hosted a televised gala performance of Beethoven's Missa Solemnis, performed by the Royal Philharmonic Orchestra and the London Philharmonic Choir conducted by Sir Gilbert Levine.

On 25 August 2007, the cathedral received a new stained glass window in the south transept. The  glass work was created by the German artist Gerhard Richter with the €400,000 cost paid by donations. It is composed of 11,500 identically sized pieces of coloured glass resembling pixels, randomly arranged by computer, which create a colourful "carpet". Since the loss of the original window in World War II, the space had been temporarily filled with plain glass. The then archbishop of the cathedral, Cardinal Joachim Meisner, who had preferred a figurative depiction of 20th-century Catholic martyrs for the window, did not attend the unveiling. Holder of the office since 2014 is Cardinal Rainer Maria Woelki.
On 5 January 2015, the cathedral remained dark as floodlights were switched off to protest a demonstration by PEGIDA.

World Heritage Site

In 1996, the cathedral was added to the UNESCO World Heritage List of culturally important sites. In 2004, it was placed on the "World Heritage in Danger" list, as the only Western site in danger, due to plans to construct several high-rise buildings nearby, which would have visually impacted the site. The cathedral was removed from the list in 2006, following the authorities' decision to limit the heights of buildings constructed near and around the cathedral.

As a World Heritage Site and host to the Shrine of the Three Kings, Cologne Cathedral is a major attraction for tourists and pilgrims, and is one of the oldest and most important pilgrimage sites of Northern Europe. The platform gives a scenic view over the Rhine.

Ongoing conservation at the cathedral is addressing the black discolouration caused by the sandstone reacting with sulfuric acid during rainfall. The acidic rain is a consequence of air pollution.

St. Joseph's Catholic Church in Washington, D.C. was modeled after the cathedral.

Architecture 

The ground plan design of Cologne Cathedral was based closely on that of Amiens Cathedral, as is the style and the width to height proportion of the central nave. The plan is in the shape of a Latin Cross, as is usual with Gothic cathedrals. It has two aisles on either side, which help support one of the very highest Gothic vaults in the world, being nearly as tall as that of the Beauvais Cathedral, much of which collapsed. Externally the outward thrust of the vault is taken by flying buttresses in the French manner. The eastern end has a single ambulatory, the second aisle resolving into a chevet of seven radiating chapels.

Internally, the medieval choir is more varied and less mechanical in its details than the 19th-century building. It presents a French style arrangement of very tall arcade, a delicate narrow triforium gallery lit by windows and with detailed tracery merging with that of the windows above. The clerestory windows are tall and retain some old figurative glass in the lower sections. The whole is united by the tall shafts that sweep unbroken from the floor to their capitals at the spring of the vault. The vault is of plain quadripartite arrangement.

The choir retains a great many of its original fittings, including the carved stalls, despite French Revolutionary troops having desecrated the building. A large stone statue of St Christopher looks down towards the place where the earlier entrance to the cathedral was, before its completion in the late 19th century.

The nave has many 19th century stained glass windows. A set of five on the south side, called the Bayernfenster, were a gift from Ludwig I of Bavaria, and strongly represent the painterly German style of the time.

Externally, particularly from a distance, the building is dominated by its huge spires, which are entirely Germanic in character, being openwork like those of Ulm, Vienna, Strasbourg and Regensburg Cathedrals.

Dimensions

Treasures 
One of the treasures of the cathedral is the high altar, which was installed in 1322. The front and sides are overlaid with white marble niches into which are set figures, with the Coronation of the Virgin at the centre.

The most celebrated work of art in the cathedral is the Shrine of the Three Kings, commissioned by Philip von Heinsberg, archbishop of Cologne from 1167 to 1191 and created by Nicholas of Verdun, begun in 1190. It is traditionally believed to hold the remains of the Three Wise Men, whose relics were acquired by Frederick Barbarossa at the conquest of Milan in 1164. The shrine takes the form of a large reliquary in the shape of a basilican church, made of bronze and silver, gilded and ornamented with architectonic details, figurative sculpture, enamels and gemstones. The shrine was opened in 1864 and was found to contain bones and garments.

Near the sacristy is the Gero Crucifix, a large crucifix carved in oak and with traces of paint and gilding. Believed to have been commissioned around 960 for Archbishop Gero, it is the oldest large crucifix north of the Alps and the earliest-known large free-standing Northern sculpture of the medieval period.

In the Sacrament Chapel is the Mailänder Madonna ("Milan Madonna"), a high Gothic carving, depicting the Blessed Virgin and the infant Jesus. It was made in the Cologne Cathedral workshop sometime around 1290 as a replacement for the original which was lost in a fire. The altar of the patron saints of Cologne with an altarpiece by the International Gothic painter Stefan Lochner is in the Marienkapelle ("St. Mary's Chapel").

After completion in 1265, the radiating chapels were immediately taken into service as a burial place. The relics of Saint Irmgardis found a final resting place in the St. Agnes’ Chapel. Her trachyte sarcophagus is considered to be created by the cathedral masons’ guild around 1280.
Other works of art are in the Cathedral Treasury.

Embedded in the interior wall are a pair of stone tablets on which are carved the provisions formulated by Archbishop Englebert II (1262–67) under which Jews were permitted to reside in Cologne.

Church music 

Cologne Cathedral has two pipe organs by Klais Orgelbau: the Transept Organ, built in 1948, and the Nave Organ, built in 1998. Cathedral organists have included Josef Zimmermann, Clemens Ganz (1985–2001) and Winfried Bönig (2001).

Bells 
The cathedral has eleven church bells, four of which are medieval. The first was the 3.8-tonne Dreikönigsglocke ("Bell of the Three Kings"), cast in 1418, installed in 1437, and recast in 1880. Two of the other bells, the Pretiosa (10.5 tonnes; at that time the largest bell in the Western world) and the Speciosa (5.6 tonnes) were installed in 1448 and remain in place today.

During the 19th century, as the building neared completion, there was a desire to increase the number of bells. This was facilitated by Kaiser Wilhelm I who gave French bronze cannon, captured in 1870–71, for this purpose. The 22 pieces of artillery were displayed outside the cathedral on 11 May 1872. Andreas Hamm in Frankenthal used them to cast a bell of over 27,000 kilos on 19 August 1873. The tone was not harmonious and another attempt was made on 13 November 1873. The Central Cathedral Association, which had agreed to take over the costs, did not want this bell either. Another attempt took place on 3 October 1874. The colossal bell was shipped to Cologne and on 13 May 1875, installed in the cathedral. This Kaiserglocke was eventually melted in 1918 to support the German war effort. The Kaiserglocke was the largest free-swinging bell in history.

The 24-tonne St. Petersglocke ("Bell of St. Peter", "" in the Kölsch language or in common parlance known as "Dicker Pitter"), was cast in 1922 and was the largest free-swinging bell in the world, until a new bell was cast in Innsbruck for the People's Salvation Cathedral in Bucharest, Romania. This bell is only rung on eight major holidays such as Easter and Christmas.

On Thursday, 3 March 2022, landmark cathedrals across Europe chimed in unison "[…] in a gesture of solidarity with Ukraine, as bystanders gathered to mourn those killed during Russia's invasion and pray for peace." The Kölner Dom was among them.

See also 

 Gothic cathedrals and churches
 List of Gothic Cathedrals in Europe
 Architecture of cathedrals and great churches
 Gero Cross
 Gothic architecture
 Gothic Revival architecture
 List of buildings and structures
 List of highest church naves
 List of cathedrals in Germany
 List of tallest structures built before the 20th century
 Medievalism

References

Sources 
 Swaan, Wim and Christopher Brooke, The Gothic Cathedral, Omega Books (1969), 
 Fletcher, Banister, A History of Architecture on the Comparative Method.
 Hubbard, Howard, Masterpieces of Western Sculpture, Thames and Hudson, 
 Wolff, Arnold, Cologne Cathedral. Its History – Its Works of Arts, Verlag (editor) Kölner Dom, Cologne: 2nd edition 2003,

External links 

 
 Cologne Cathedral music 
 unesco World Heritage Sites, Cologne Cathedral
 Web cam showing Cologne Cathedral 
 
 5 Gigapixels GigaPan of Cologne Cathedral

 
Churches completed in 1880
Former world's tallest buildings
Gothic architecture in Germany
Landmarks in Cologne
Landmarks in Germany
Roman Catholic cathedrals in North Rhine-Westphalia
Tourist attractions in Cologne
Innenstadt, Cologne
World Heritage Sites in Germany
Christian architecture
Articles containing video clips
1880 establishments in Germany